Leishiyo Keishing or K Leishiyo is an Naga people politician from Manipur, India. He has been elected from Phungyar Assembly Constituency in 2017 and 2022 as Naga People's Front Candidate in Manipur Legislative Assembly and had served as Chairman of its Hill Area Committee from 2020 till 2022.

Early life
Leishiyo Keishing born on 1st March 1974 is the eldest of the 4 sons of Mr.Samphang Keishing and Mrs.Martha Ningshen of Nambashi Horton village in Kamjong district, Manipur. He completed BE (Electrical) from Muzaffarpur Institute of Technology and did post graduate Diploma in Thermal Power Plant Engineering from National Power Training Institute and MBA in Human Resource Management. After completing his studies, he briefly worked as Mathematics teacher at Nambashi High School and Ukhrul Public School. He served as Manager (Electrical) for J&K "Rail Link Project" under Indian Railway Construction (IRCON). From 2010, he worked with the Central Public Works Department (CPWD) as Engineer (Electrical) till 2016 when he voluntarily resigned from the job to contest the Manipur Assembly Elections.

Political career
In an exclusive interview with AJA a Tangkhul vernacular daily, Leishiyo Keishing stated that he entered politics with the main objective to serve the people at his prime age and not after superannuation as many people opt to do. In the 11th Manipur Assembly General Elections, he contested as Naga People's Front (NPF) candidate and won the race beating his nearest rival Somi Awungshi of BJP by a huge margin of 4778 votes. Leishiyo Keishing was initially inducted as a Parliamentary Secretary in the BJP led Coalition Government of Manipur until the position was scrubbed in 2018. The political tide within the BJP led coalition was on a bumpy path when the NPF "In Principle" decided to pull out of the coalition in the run up to the Lok Sabha Elections in May 2019. The decision was however, withdrawn after due consultations.

In 2019, he toured the remotest border villages within his constituency and pointed out that no development works were undertaken in Phungyar Assembly Constituency for the past 20 years. He also lamented the disparity between the funds allocated for development between the valley constituencies and that of the hills. Phungyar Assembly Constituency, according to Leishiyo Keishing is larger than the whole area covered by the 40 constituencies in the valley. However, annual developmental fund allocated is a meagre 2 crore INR equivalent to the amount allocated to Singjamei AC the smallest Assembly Constituency in Manipur. Pathetic condition of the constituency in terms of road connectivity and electrification, according to Leishiyo Keishing hopefully will change with the implementation of various state and centrally sponsored programs.

References

Living people
1974 births
Manipur politicians
Indian National Congress politicians
Naga People's Front politicians
Manipur MLAs 2017–2022
Manipur MLAs 2022–2027
People from Kamjong district